San Ignacio de Velasco Municipality is the first municipal section of José Miguel de Velasco Province in  Santa Cruz Department, Bolivia. Its capital is San Ignacio de Velasco. Towns in the municipality include Santa Ana de Velasco.

Languages 
The languages spoken in the San Ignacio de Velasco Municipality are mainly Spanish, Chiquitano, and Quechua.

Places of interest 
 Laguna Bellavista
Chaplín Lake

References 
 obd.descentralizacion.gov.bo

External links 
 Map of José Miguel de Velasco Province
 Statistical Data: San Ignacio de Velasco Municipality (Spanish)
 Informe Sobre Desarrollo Humano 2004, Consultas, Santa Cruz) (Spanish)

Municipalities of Santa Cruz Department (Bolivia)